The 1970 Harvard Crimson football team was an American football team that represented Harvard University during the 1970 NCAA University Division football season. Harvard tied for second in the Ivy League.

In their 14th and final year under head coach John Yovicsin, the Crimson compiled a 7–2 record and outscored opponents 227 to 157. Gary W. Farneti was the team captain.

Harvard's 5–2 conference record tied for second place in the Ivy League standings. The Crimson outscored Ivy opponents 160 to 141. 

Harvard played its home games at Harvard Stadium in the Allston neighborhood of Boston, Massachusetts.

Schedule

References

Harvard
Harvard Crimson football seasons
Harvard Crimson football
Harvard Crimson football